Maria Luiza Reis Galli (born 17 November 1971) is a Brazilian actress, playwright, and stage director.

Biography 
Galli was born on 17 November 1971 in Rio de Janeiro.

Career 
Her debut project was in the miniseries Anos Rebeldes, where she portrayed Jurema. She got a major role in the telenovelas A Grande Família in 2001 and Carga Pesada in 2005.

Filmography

Television

Cinema

 Paraíso Perdido (2018)

References 

Brazilian actresses
Living people
1971 births